Kalakkad S. Ramanarayana Iyer (10 October 1910 – 1992) was a Carnatic musician and composer born in Kalakkad, Tirunelveli District, Tamil Nadu, India. He was also awarded the Kalaimamani award by the Government of Tamil Nadu marking his dedication and service.

References

External links
Article in The Hindu
Iyer popularizing Koteeswara Iyer krithis
. Composed by Shri Papanasam Sivan

1910 births
1992 deaths
Carnatic composers
People from Tamil Nadu
20th-century Indian musicians